Sunil Vaidyanathan is an internationally renowned author, photojournalist and environmentalist who has nine books on photography, architecture and travel to his credit. His latest book ‘Rivers of India’, explores the symbiosis between the major rivers of India and the people who live along them.

He has also been featured in various prestigious publications which include: Jet Wings in-flight magazines, FlyLite, Heritage India, ZeiTGeiST Asia, Travel X, RCI Holiday Magazine UK, A & M, Afternoon Dispatch and Courier, Swagat, Femina, Gifts & Accessories, Eicher Map Books, Travel Plus (India Today), Asian Photography, Interval World, Vara - Maldivian Airlines in-flight magazine, Discover India, Express Estates, Lok Satta and Mid Day to mention a few.

Sunil currently lives in Mumbai, India's commercial capital.

Some of his published books include

Heritage Buildings of Bombay (1998, English Edition Publishers)
Temples of South India (2000, English Edition Publishers)
Ganesha - The God of India (2003, English Edition Publishers)
Colourful India (2005, English Edition Publishers)
Pilgrimage Places in India (2006, Magna Books)
Portrait of Kerala [Principal Photographer] (2007, New Holland, London)
Portrait of Rajasthan [Contributing Photographer] (2007, New Holland, London)
A guide to the National Capital Region NCR (2008, Eicher Good Earth Ltd)
Rivers of India (2011, Niyogi Books)

External links
http://www.mid-day.com/lifestyle/2011/aug/040811-Shayoni-Mitra-Sunil-Vaidyanathan-coffee-table-book.htm
http://www.scribesontheroad.com/publication.aspx
http://blog.scribesontheroad.com

Indian male writers
Writers from Mumbai
Living people
1976 births